Nejc Žnidarčič (born 1 April 1984) is a Slovenian male canoeist who was World champion at Wildwater Canoeing World Championships in 2011, 2012 and 2019.

References

External links
 
 

1984 births
Living people
Slovenian male canoeists
People from the Municipality of Šempeter-Vrtojba